Leon James Britton (born 16 September 1982) is an English footballer and coach who plays for Ammanford in the Cymru South. A midfielder, he spent most of his career with Swansea City, having joined Swansea on a permanent transfer in 2003. Britton went on to make 520 appearances for the club. He joined Sheffield United in the summer of 2010, but transferred back to Swansea in January 2011. Britton instantly became a central figure in Swansea's successful promotion campaign. He remains one of a handful of players to have represented any club in all four professional divisions of the English footballing pyramid, along with Brett Ormerod, and former Swansea teammates Alan Tate and Garry Monk. He later played twice for Llanelli Town and signed for Ammanford in February 2021.

Playing career

Youth career
A member of the England Development School at Lilleshall where he was a year behind Joe Cole, Britton began his career as an Arsenal trainee at the age of nine. When he signed for West Ham United for £400,000 in 1998, he attracted the highest transfer fee ever paid for a 16-year-old at that time. Unable to break into the first team at West Ham, Britton joined Swansea City on loan in December 2002, helping the club to avoid relegation from the Football League. He was named PFA Fans' Player of the Year for the Third Division in the 2002–03 season. Swansea manager Brian Flynn was impressed enough to sign him permanently after he was released by West Ham.

Swansea City
With Swansea, Britton went on to win the club's Player of the Year award in both the 2002–03 and 2005–06 seasons.

Including his appearances whilst on loan with the club, to the end of the 2005–06 season, Britton had played 137 times for Swansea City in all competitions (with a further 18 appearances as a substitute) and had scored nine goals.

On 9 February 2008, Britton played his 200th match for Swansea City. In January 2010, Swansea rejected an £750,000 offer for Britton from Wigan Athletic but at the end of that season Britton refused the offer of a new contract and became a free agent.

Sheffield United
Despite interest from the Premier League, Britton signed for Sheffield United in June 2010. He was handed a regular role in the centre of the Blades midfield but failed to really show the form he had displayed at Swansea. A difficult period for the club, Britton played under four managers within the space of five months and eventually asked to return to his former employer, stating that his previous transfer had been a "mistake" and that he "should never have left Swansea". The Blades admitted that he had never settled in South Yorkshire and agreed to let him return to Wales after only 26 appearances for the club.

Return to Swansea
Britton re-signed for Swansea City for what the Blades described as an "undisclosed fee" during the January transfer window despite the Swans insisting no fee was involved. The fee was clause based and included up to £400,000 depending on appearances and Swansea's promotion to the Premier League.

Britton's second Swansea City debut came in a draw with Barnsley on 20 January 2011. He scored his first goal of the season (his first goal in three and a half years) against his former employers Sheffield United in the final match of the regular season.

The 2010–11 season ended with Swansea City being promoted to the Premier League for the first time in their history following a 4–2 victory over Reading in the Championship Play-off Final at Wembley Stadium. Britton started the match at Wembley and completed 77 minutes before being substituted by Mark Gower.

Following Swansea's promotion, Britton made his Premier League debut in a 4–0 loss against Manchester City on 15 August 2011 where he played in the central midfield. Britton stated he would like to finish his career with the club and admitted he cannot imagine playing elsewhere.

On 30 March 2012, Britton signed a contract extension at Swansea City, contracting him until the end of the 2015 campaign.

On 5 February 2013, Britton signed a one-year contract extension on improved terms with Swansea City, keeping at the club until June 2016.

Later that month, Britton played as Swansea beat Bradford City 5–0 in the 2013 League Cup Final at Wembley Stadium.

On 11 May 2018, it was announced that Britton would retire from professional football after the end of the 2017–18 season. He opted to become a club ambassador following Swansea City's relegation to the Championship.

Llanelli Town
In January 2019, Britton returned to football, joining Welsh Premier League side Llanelli Town. He made his debut for the club in a 2–1 win over Llandudno. On 2 February 2019, in a 0–0 draw away at Cefn Druids in his second league game for the club, Britton suffered a broken foot.

Coaching and backroom roles
In November 2017, Swansea manager Paul Clement appointed Britton as an assistant coach, after the departure of Claude Makélélé from the coaching staff. Britton remained available for selection as a player, but relinquished his captaincy following his coaching appointment.

Britton was named caretaker manager at Swansea on 21 December 2017, after the dismissal of Clement the previous day. In his first game in charge, on 23 December, Swansea drew 1–1 at home to Crystal Palace, a result which left them at the bottom of the league. Britton remained in charge for Swansea's Boxing Day match against Liverpool at Anfield, where the Swans were comprehensively beaten 5–0. This was his last match as caretaker manager as the Swans appointed former Sheffield Wednesday coach Carlos Carvalhal as their new manager. Britton then chose to relinquish his coaching duties to concentrate on playing.

Britton was appointed football advisor to the board of directors at Swansea City on 21 May 2019. Along with chairman Trevor Birch and club president Alan Curtis, Britton helped choose Steve Cooper as Swansea's new manager following the departure of Graham Potter in 2019. Britton was appointed Swansea's first Sporting Director on 4 September 2019, but relinquished his duties in June 2020.

Personal life
Britton was born in Merton, Greater London and played a young Ryan Giggs in a road safety advertisement in the 1990s. Britton also appeared in a Walkers Crisps advert with former England international Gary Lineker.

Career statistics

Managerial statistics

Honours

Club
Swansea City
Football League Cup: 2012–13
Football League Championship play-offs: 2011
Football League One: 2007–08
Football League Two third-place promotion: 2004–05
Football League Trophy: 2005–06
FAW Premier Cup: 2004–05, 2005–06

Individual
PFA Fans' Player of the Year (Third Division): 2002–03
Swansea City Player of the Year: 2002–03, 2006–07

References

External links

Leon Britton profile at the Swansea City A.F.C. website
Leon Britton profile at the Football Association website

1982 births
Living people
Footballers from the London Borough of Merton
English footballers
England youth international footballers
Association football midfielders
Arsenal F.C. players
West Ham United F.C. players
Swansea City A.F.C. players
Sheffield United F.C. players
English Football League players
Premier League players
English football managers
Swansea City A.F.C. managers
Premier League managers
Llanelli Town A.F.C. players
Cymru Premier players
Swansea City A.F.C. non-playing staff
Ammanford A.F.C. players